Parallel thinking is a term coined by Edward de Bono. Parallel thinking is described as a constructive alternative to: "adversarial thinking"; debate; and the approaches exemplified by Socrates, Plato, and Aristotle (whom de Bono refers to as the "Greek gang of three" (GG3)  ). In general parallel thinking is a further development of the well known lateral thinking processes, focusing even more on explorations—looking for what can be rather than for what is.

Definition
Parallel thinking is defined as a thinking process where focus is split in specific directions. When done in a group it effectively avoids the consequences of the adversarial approach (as used in courts).

In adversarial debate, the objective is to prove or disprove statements put forward by the parties (normally two). This is also known as the dialectic approach. In Parallel Thinking, practitioners put forward as many statements as possible in several (preferably more than two) parallel tracks. This leads to exploration of a subject where all participants can contribute, in parallel, with knowledge, facts, feelings, etc.

Crucial to the method is that the process is done in a disciplined manner, and that all participants play along and contribute in parallel. Thus each participant must stick to the specific track.

Implementations
 Six Thinking Hats

See also
 Dialectics
 Lateral thinking
 Systems thinking
 Adversarial system
 TRIZ

References

Cognition
Problem solving skills